Calamagrostis stricta, known as slim-stem small reed grass or narrow small-reed,  is a species of bunchgrass in the family Poaceae of the Holarctic Kingdom.

Description

General description
The leaf-sheaths are keelless and have a glabrous surface. The leaf-blade also have a ribbed and pubescent surface with scaberulous margins the apex of which is filiformed.

Spikelets and lemma
Its lemma have a toothed apex which is also truncate and awned.

Glumes, flowers and fruits
The glumes are firmer than fertile lemma and are elliptic, membranous, with acute apexes and asperulous surfaces. The flowers have two lodicules and two stigmas. The fruits also have a farinosed endosperm and punctiform hilum.

Distribution
Calamagrostis stricta is found in wetlands throughout Eurasia (including Siberia) and into Mongolia and China. It is also common in Canada and the United States to which it was possibly introduced.

References

stricta
Flora of Asia
Flora of Europe
Grasses of the United States
Grasses of Canada